Henry Condell (1576–1627) was an English actor.

Henry Condell may also refer to:

Henry Condell (mayor) (1797–1871), mayor of Melbourne, Australia
Henry Condell (musician) (1757–1834), English violinist and composer